Gregory J. Costantino (born August 11, 1960) is an American politician and a Democratic member of the Rhode Island House of Representatives. He has represented District 44 since January 1, 2013. Outside of his work in government, Costantino works as the vice president of operations for Venda Ravioli.

Education 
Costantino graduated from La Salle Academy in 1978 and attended Providence College.

Elections
2012 Costantino challenged District 44 incumbent Democratic Representative Peter Petrarca in the September 11, 2012 Democratic Primary, winning with 1,039 votes (60%) and won the November 6, 2012 General election with 4,647 votes (62.1%) against Republican nominee James Archer.

References

External links
Official page at the Rhode Island General Assembly
Campaign site

Gregory Costantino at Ballotpedia
Gregory J. Costantino at the National Institute on Money in State Politics

Place of birth missing (living people)
1960 births
Living people
Democratic Party members of the Rhode Island House of Representatives
People from Providence County, Rhode Island
Providence College alumni
21st-century American politicians